Nanomedicine is the medical application of nanotechnology. Nanomedicine ranges from the medical applications of nanomaterials and biological devices, to nanoelectronic biosensors, and even possible future applications of molecular nanotechnology such as biological machines. Current problems for nanomedicine involve understanding the issues related to toxicity and environmental impact of nanoscale materials (materials whose structure is on the scale of nanometers, i.e. billionths of a meter).

Functionalities can be added to nanomaterials by interfacing them with biological molecules or structures. The size of nanomaterials is similar to that of most biological molecules and structures; therefore, nanomaterials can be useful for both in vivo and in vitro biomedical research and applications. Thus far, the integration of nanomaterials with biology has led to the development of diagnostic devices, contrast agents, analytical tools, physical therapy applications, and drug delivery vehicles.

Nanomedicine seeks to deliver a valuable set of research tools and clinically useful devices in the near future. The National Nanotechnology Initiative expects new commercial applications in the pharmaceutical industry that may include advanced drug delivery systems, new therapies, and in vivo imaging. Nanomedicine research is receiving funding from the US National Institutes of Health Common Fund program, supporting four nanomedicine development centers.

Nanomedicine sales reached $16 billion in 2015, with a minimum of $3.8 billion in nanotechnology R&D being invested every year. Global funding for emerging nanotechnology increased by 45% per year in recent years, with product sales exceeding $1 trillion in 2013. As the nanomedicine industry continues to grow, it is expected to have a significant impact on the economy.

Drug delivery
 Nanotechnology has provided the possibility of delivering drugs to specific cells using the nanoparticles. The overall drug consumption and side-effects may be lowered significantly by depositing the active pharmaceutical agent in the morbid region only and in no higher dose than needed. Targeted drug delivery is intended to reduce the side effects of drugs with concomitant decreases in consumption and treatment expenses. Additionally, targeted drug delivery reduces the side effect possessed by crude drug via minimizing undesired exposure to the healthy cells. Drug delivery focuses on maximizing bioavailability both at specific places in the body and over a period of time. This can potentially be achieved by molecular targeting by nanoengineered devices. A benefit of using nanoscale for medical technologies is that smaller devices are less invasive and can possibly be implanted inside the body, plus biochemical reaction times are much shorter. These devices are faster and more sensitive than typical drug delivery. The efficacy of drug delivery through nanomedicine is largely based upon: a) efficient encapsulation of the drugs, b) successful delivery of drug to the targeted region of the body, and c) successful release of the drug. Several nano-delivery drugs were on the market by 2019.

Drug delivery systems, lipid- or polymer-based nanoparticles, can be designed to improve the pharmacokinetics and biodistribution of the drug. However, the pharmacokinetics and pharmacodynamics of nanomedicine is highly variable among different patients. When designed to avoid the body's defence mechanisms, nanoparticles have beneficial properties that can be used to improve drug delivery. Complex drug delivery mechanisms are being developed, including the ability to get drugs through cell membranes and into cell cytoplasm. Triggered response is one way for drug molecules to be used more efficiently. Drugs are placed in the body and only activate on encountering a particular signal. For example, a drug with poor solubility will be replaced by a drug delivery system where both hydrophilic and hydrophobic environments exist, improving the solubility. Drug delivery systems may also be able to prevent tissue damage through regulated drug release; reduce drug clearance rates; or lower the volume of distribution and reduce the effect on non-target tissue.  However, the biodistribution of these nanoparticles is still imperfect due to the complex host's reactions to nano- and microsized materials and the difficulty in targeting specific organs in the body. Nevertheless, a lot of work is still ongoing to optimize and better understand the potential and limitations of nanoparticulate systems. While advancement of research proves that targeting and distribution can be augmented by nanoparticles, the dangers of nanotoxicity become an important next step in further understanding of their medical uses. The toxicity of nanoparticles varies, depending on size, shape, and material. These factors also affect the build-up and organ damage that may occur. Nanoparticles are made to be long-lasting, but this causes them to be trapped within organs, specifically the liver and spleen, as they cannot be broken down or excreted. This build-up of non-biodegradable material has been observed to cause organ damage and inflammation in mice. Magnetic targeted delivery of magnetic nanoparticles to the tumor site under the influence of inhomogeneous stationary magnetic fields may lead to enhanced tumor growth. In order to circumvent the pro-tumorigenic effects, alternating electromagnetic fields should be used.

Nanoparticles are under research for their potential to decrease antibiotic resistance or for various antimicrobial uses. Nanoparticles might also be used to circumvent multidrug resistance (MDR) mechanisms.

Systems under research 
Advances in lipid nanotechnology were instrumental in engineering medical nanodevices and novel drug delivery systems, as well as in developing sensing applications. Another system for microRNA delivery under preliminary research is nanoparticles formed by the self-assembly of two different microRNAs deregulated in cancer. One potential application is based on small electromechanical systems, such as nanoelectromechanical systems being investigated for the active release of drugs and sensors for possible cancer treatment with iron nanoparticles or gold shells.

Applications 
Some nanotechnology-based drugs that are commercially available or in human clinical trials include:
Abraxane, approved by the U.S. Food and Drug Administration (FDA) to treat breast cancer,  non-small- cell lung cancer (NSCLC) and pancreatic cancer,  is the nanoparticle albumin bound paclitaxel.
Doxil was originally approved by the FDA for the use on HIV-related Kaposi's sarcoma. It is now being used to also treat ovarian cancer and multiple myeloma. The drug is encased in liposomes, which helps to extend the life of the drug that is being distributed. Liposomes are self-assembling, spherical, closed colloidal structures that are composed of lipid bilayers that surround an aqueous space. The liposomes also help to increase the functionality and it helps to decrease the damage that the drug does to the heart muscles specifically. 
Onivyde, liposome encapsulated irinotecan to treat metastatic pancreatic cancer, was approved by FDA in October 2015.
Rapamune is a nanocrystal-based drug that was approved by the FDA in 2000 to prevent organ rejection after transplantation. The nanocrystal components allow for increased drug solubility and dissolution rate, leading to improved absorption and high bioavailability.
Cabenuva is approved by FDA as cabotegravir extended-release injectable nano-suspension, plus rilpivirine extended-release injectable nano-suspension. It is indicated as a complete regimen for the treatment of HIV-1 infection in adults to replace the current antiretroviral regimen in those who are virologically suppressed (HIV-1 RNA less than 50 copies per mL) on a stable antiretroviral regimen with no history of treatment failure and with no known or suspected resistance to either cabotegravir or rilpivirine. This is the first FDA-approved injectable, complete regimen for HIV-1 infected adults that is administered once a month.

Imaging 
In vivo imaging is another area where tools and devices are being developed. Using nanoparticle contrast agents, images such as ultrasound and MRI have a favorable distribution and improved contrast. In cardiovascular imaging, nanoparticles have potential to aid visualization of blood pooling, ischemia, angiogenesis, atherosclerosis, and focal areas where inflammation is present.

The small size of nanoparticles endows them with properties that can be very useful in oncology, particularly in imaging. Quantum dots (nanoparticles with quantum confinement properties, such as size-tunable light emission), when used in conjunction with MRI (magnetic resonance imaging), can produce exceptional images of tumor sites. Nanoparticles of cadmium selenide (quantum dots) glow when exposed to ultraviolet light. When injected, they seep into cancer tumors. The surgeon can see the glowing tumor, and use it as a guide for more accurate tumor removal. These nanoparticles are much brighter than organic dyes and only need one light source for excitation. This means that the use of fluorescent quantum dots could produce a higher contrast image and at a lower cost than today's organic dyes used as contrast media. The downside, however, is that quantum dots are usually made of quite toxic elements, but this concern may be addressed by use of fluorescent dopants.

Tracking movement can help determine how well drugs are being distributed or how substances are metabolized. It is difficult to track a small group of cells throughout the body, so scientists used to dye the cells. These dyes needed to be excited by light of a certain wavelength in order for them to light up. While different color dyes absorb different frequencies of light, there was a need for as many light sources as cells. A way around this problem is with luminescent tags. These tags are quantum dots attached to proteins that penetrate cell membranes. The dots can be random in size, can be made of bio-inert material, and they demonstrate the nanoscale property that color is size-dependent. As a result, sizes are selected so that the frequency of light used to make a group of quantum dots fluoresce is an even multiple of the frequency required to make another group incandesce. Then both groups can be lit with a single light source. They have also found a way to insert nanoparticles into the affected parts of the body so that those parts of the body will glow showing the tumor growth or shrinkage or also organ trouble.

Sensing 
Nanotechnology-on-a-chip is one more dimension of lab-on-a-chip technology. Magnetic nanoparticles, bound to a suitable antibody, are used to label specific molecules, structures or microorganisms. In particular silica nanoparticles are inert from the photophysical point of view and might accumulate a large number of dye(s) within the nanoparticle shell. Gold nanoparticles tagged with short segments of DNA can be used for detection of genetic sequence in a sample. Multicolor optical coding for biological assays has been achieved by embedding different-sized quantum dots into polymeric microbeads. Nanopore technology for analysis of nucleic acids converts strings of nucleotides directly into electronic signatures.

Sensor test chips containing thousands of nanowires, able to detect proteins and other biomarkers left behind by cancer cells, could enable the detection and diagnosis of cancer in the early stages from a few drops of a patient's blood. Nanotechnology is helping to advance the use of arthroscopes, which are pencil-sized devices that are used in surgeries with lights and cameras so surgeons can do the surgeries with smaller incisions. The smaller the incisions the faster the healing time which is better for the patients. It is also helping to find a way to make an arthroscope smaller than a strand of hair.

Research on nanoelectronics-based cancer diagnostics could lead to tests that can be done in pharmacies.  The results promise to be highly accurate and the product promises to be inexpensive.  They could take a very small amount of blood and detect cancer anywhere in the body in about five minutes, with a sensitivity that is a thousand times better a conventional laboratory test.  These devices are built with nanowires to detect cancer proteins; each nanowire detector is primed to be sensitive to a different cancer marker. The biggest advantage of the nanowire detectors is that they could test for anywhere from ten to one hundred similar medical conditions without adding cost to the testing device. Nanotechnology has also helped to personalize oncology for the detection, diagnosis, and treatment of cancer. It is now able to be tailored to each individual's tumor for better performance. They have found ways that they will be able to target a specific part of the body that is being affected by cancer.

Sepsis treatment

In contrast to dialysis, which works on the principle of the size related diffusion of solutes and ultrafiltration of fluid across a semi-permeable membrane, the purification with nanoparticles allows specific targeting of substances. Additionally larger compounds which are commonly not dialyzable can be removed.

The purification process is based on functionalized iron oxide or carbon coated metal nanoparticles with ferromagnetic or superparamagnetic properties. Binding agents such as proteins,  antibiotics, or synthetic ligands are covalently linked to the particle surface. These binding agents are able to interact with target species forming an agglomerate. Applying an external magnetic field gradient allows exerting a force on the nanoparticles. Hence the particles can be separated from the bulk fluid, thereby cleaning it from the contaminants.

The small size (< 100 nm) and large surface area of functionalized nanomagnets leads to advantageous properties compared to hemoperfusion, which is a clinically used technique for the purification of blood and is based on surface adsorption. These advantages are high loading and accessible for binding agents, high selectivity towards the target compound, fast diffusion, small hydrodynamic resistance, and low dosage.

Tissue engineering 
Nanotechnology may be used as part of tissue engineering to help reproduce or repair or reshape damaged tissue using suitable nanomaterial-based scaffolds and growth factors. Tissue engineering if successful may replace conventional treatments like organ transplants or artificial implants. Nanoparticles such as graphene, carbon nanotubes, molybdenum disulfide and tungsten disulfide are being used as reinforcing agents to fabricate mechanically strong biodegradable polymeric nanocomposites for bone tissue engineering applications. The addition of these nanoparticles in the polymer matrix at low concentrations (~0.2 weight %) leads to significant improvements in the compressive and flexural mechanical properties of polymeric nanocomposites.  Potentially, these nanocomposites may be used as a novel, mechanically strong, light weight composite as bone implants.

For example, a flesh welder was demonstrated to fuse two pieces of chicken meat into a single piece using a suspension of gold-coated nanoshells activated by an infrared laser. This could be used to weld arteries during surgery.
Another example is nanonephrology, the use of nanomedicine on the kidney.

Medical devices 

Neuro-electronic interfacing is a visionary goal dealing with the construction of nanodevices that will permit computers to be joined and linked to the nervous system. This idea requires the building of a molecular structure that will permit control and detection of nerve impulses by an external computer. A refuelable strategy implies energy is refilled continuously or periodically with external sonic, chemical, tethered, magnetic, or biological electrical sources, while a non-refuelable strategy implies that all power is drawn from internal energy storage which would stop when all energy is drained. A nanoscale enzymatic biofuel cell for self-powered nanodevices have been developed that uses glucose from biofluids including human blood and watermelons. One limitation to this innovation is the fact that electrical interference or leakage or overheating from power consumption is possible. The wiring of the structure is extremely difficult because they must be positioned precisely in the nervous system. The structures that will provide the interface must also be compatible with the body's immune system.

Cell repair machines
Molecular nanotechnology is a speculative subfield of nanotechnology regarding the possibility of engineering molecular assemblers, machines which could re-order matter at a molecular or atomic scale. Nanomedicine would make use of these nanorobots, introduced into the body, to repair or detect damages and infections. Molecular nanotechnology is highly theoretical, seeking to anticipate what inventions nanotechnology might yield and to propose an agenda for future inquiry. The proposed elements of molecular nanotechnology, such as molecular assemblers and nanorobots are far beyond current capabilities. Future advances in nanomedicine could give rise to life extension through the repair of many processes thought to be responsible for aging. K. Eric Drexler, one of the founders of nanotechnology, postulated cell repair machines, including ones operating within cells and utilizing as yet hypothetical molecular machines, in his 1986 book Engines of Creation, with the first technical discussion of medical nanorobots by Robert Freitas appearing in 1999. Raymond Kurzweil, a futurist and transhumanist, stated in his book The Singularity Is Near that he believes that advanced medical nanorobotics could completely remedy the effects of aging by 2030. According to Richard Feynman, it was his former graduate student and collaborator Albert Hibbs who originally suggested to him the idea of a medical use for Feynman's theoretical micromachines (see nanotechnology). Hibbs suggested that certain repair machines might one day be reduced in size to the point that it would, in theory, be possible to (as Feynman put it) "swallow the doctor". The idea was incorporated into Feynman's 1959 essay There's Plenty of Room at the Bottom.

See also 

British Society for Nanomedicine
Colloidal gold
Heart nanotechnology
IEEE P1906.1 – Recommended Practice for Nanoscale and Molecular Communication Framework
Impalefection

Monitoring (medicine)
Nanobiotechnology
Nanoparticle–biomolecule conjugate
Nanozymes
Nanotechnology in fiction
Photodynamic therapy
Top-down and bottom-up design

References